"I Don't Care" is a song by Puerto Rican singer Ricky Martin from his eighth studio album, Life (2005). It was released on September 13, 2005, as the album's lead single. The original English version of the song features rapper Fat Joe and R&B singer Amerie, while its Spanish version, "Qué Más Da" ("Who Cares"), replaces Amerie's vocals with Debi Nova's. Martin performed "I Don't Care" at the 2006 Winter Olympics closing ceremony.

Music video
The music videos for "I Don't Care" and "Qué Más Da" were filmed in Brooklyn, New York City, and directed by Diane Martel. The video for the English version features Fat Joe and Amerie, and the Spanish version features Fat Joe and Debi Nova. Both videos premiered simultaneously in September 2005.

Chart performance
"I Don't Care" peaked at number 65 on the US Billboard Hot 100, thanks to its digital downloads (number 42 on the Hot Digital Songs). It was also well received on the Hot Dance Club Play, peaking at number three. It also peaked at number 49 on the US Pop 100 and "Qué Más Da" reached number seven on the Hot Latin Songs. As of January 2011, the song had sold 124,000 digital copies in the United States.

"I Don't Care" peaked at number six in Italy and number ten in Finland. Other peaks include number eleven in the United Kingdom, number sixteen in France, number twenty-one in Germany, and number twenty-five in Australia.

Live performances
Martin delivered a performance of "I Don't Care" on the BBC's Top of the Pops on September 25, 2005.

Track listings
European CD single
"I Don't Care" (Single Version) – 3:52
"I Don't Care" (Luny Tunes Reggaeton Mix) – 3:23

European CD maxi single
"I Don't Care" (Single Version)  – 3:52
"Qué Más Da (I Don't Care)"  – 3:52
"I Don't Care" (Rishi Rich Remix)  – 4:09
"I Don't Care" (L.E.X. Reggaeton Mix)  – 4:23
"I Don't Care" (L.E.X. Club Mix)  – 9:18
"I Don't Care" (Ralphi and Craig's Club Radio Edit)  – 3:36

Australian CD maxi single
"I Don't Care" (Single Version)  – 3:52
"Qué Más Da (I Don't Care)"  – 3:52
"I Don't Care" (Ralphi and Craig's Club Radio Edit)  – 3:36
"I Don't Care" (L.E.X. Reggaeton Mix)  – 4:23
"I Don't Care" (Rishi Rich Remix)  – 4:09

Charts

Weekly charts

Year-end charts

References

2005 singles
2005 songs
Amerie songs
Columbia Records singles
Fat Joe songs
Music videos directed by Diane Martel
Ricky Martin songs
Song recordings produced by Scott Storch
Songs written by Fat Joe
Songs written by Scott Storch
Songs written by Sean Garrett
Crunk songs